Francisco Maria de Sousa Ribeiro Telles GCIH • GOM • GCM (born 10 May 1953) is a Portuguese diplomat, who served as the Executive Secretary of the Community of Portuguese Language Countries, also known as the Lusophone Commonwealth, from January 2019 until July 2021.

Career
Telles Ribeiro served as Portuguese Ambassador to Cabo Verde (2002-2006), Portuguese Ambassador to Angola (2007-2012), Portuguese Ambassador to Brazil (2012-2016) and Portuguese Ambassador to Italy (2016-2018).

References

Executive Secretaries of the Community of Portuguese Language Countries
Living people
1953 births
Portuguese diplomats
University of Lisbon alumni
Italy
Portugal
Ambassadors of Portugal to Angola
Ambassadors of Portugal to Brazil